The Kia Sorento is a mid-size crossover SUV (formerly a body-on-frame SUV until 2009) produced since 2002 by South Korean manufacturer Kia.

First generation (BL; 2002)

2002–2006

Debuted in February 2002, the first generation Sorento was a traditional truck-based body-on-frame SUV. All American Sorentos also came with dual front airbags and dual side-curtain airbags in the front and rear. An optional four-wheel drive system with low range received praise for adding to the vehicle's off-road ability.

It had two transmission options, a 5-speed manual or 4- and 5-speed automatic (pre-2005 models have a 4-speed automatic, whilst 2005 Sorentos came with a 5-speed tip-tronic style automatic).
Common features of the first generation Sorento were 4-wheel disc brakes (standard on all models), optional anti-lock braking system (ABS), and a 21.1-gallon (79.9 litres) fuel tank.

There were two trim levels available for the Sorento: either the base LX or the up-level EX. Both models included an AM/FM stereo with a single-disc CD player and an eight-speaker audio system, dual front airbags and front and rear side-impact SRS airbags (side-impact front and rear SRS airbags for North American-market models ONLY), cloth seating surfaces, a power-adjustable front driver's seat, air conditioning, power door locks and windows, tinted windows, aluminum-alloy wheels, keyless entry, wood interior trim accents, a split-folding second-row rear bench seat, and monotone exterior paint as standard equipment. Features such as satellite radio (on later models), leather-trimmed seating surfaces, heated front seats, a ten-speaker premium audio system, cassette and CD players, an in-dash CD changer, power front bucket seats, seventeen-inch (17") aluminum-alloy wheels, a power sunroof, two-tone exterior paint, and a security system were available regardless of trim level choice.

2007–2009

Projector beam headlamps were added, along with new tail lamps. The 5-speed manual transmission was no longer available; the 5-speed Sportmatic tip-tronic automatic transmission was made standard for all vehicles. Most of the EX trim had full-time AWD and 4x4 Low modes; The LX had a part-time system with 2WD High (rear wheel drive), 4WD High (not for dry pavement) and 4WD Low modes. The 2007 Kia Sorento earned a five-star crash safety rating, the highest rating possible, for all seating positions in frontal and side impact crash tests conducted by the National Highway Traffic Safety Administration (NHTSA). The tail lights and front end were upgraded, but the two-box design stayed.

Safety
The 2003 Sorento received Poor to Average ratings from the Insurance Institute for Highway Safety (IIHS). The 2007 facelifted version had improved safety ratings for moderate overlap front crashes and head restraints & seats, but retained its Poor side impact rating.

Second generation (XM; 2009) 

A redesigned Sorento (codename XM) was launched in South Korea in April 2009. The second generation was Kia's first model to be manufactured in the United States, in Kia's new US$1 billion West Point, Georgia, factory (which also builds the sister vehicle to the Sorento, the Hyundai Santa Fe). The second generation used Kia's corporate Tiger Nose grille, and was the first Kia vehicle to offer Kia UVO. The vice president of marketing for Kia Motors America said that Kia initially considered changing the name due to the radical change in the Sorento's body style.

The second-generation Sorento introduced Kia's new design language, and introduced new features and technology that would later become available on other Kia models.

The four-cylinder model returned to the lineup for North American models after being absent between 2007 and 2010. The engine was transverse, and the suspension all-independent. The change in body construction as well as the loss of a low-ratio transfer case made the Sorento 475 pounds less than the old one model for model, to gain in performance and economy.

The second generation Sorento was originally available in four models – the Base, LX, EX and top-of-the-line SX models. The SX is only available with the 3.5-liter  V6. The Base and LX both come standard with the 2.4-liter straight-4  and EX has the GDI version of the same engine which is rated 191 hp. The V6 is available as an upgrade for both the LX and EX. The SX Limited model became available in 2012.

Facelift
The Sorento received a mid-cycle refresh for the 2014 model year, unveiled in 2012 at the Los Angeles International Auto Show, and went on sale in first quarter of 2013. Major changes included a revised instrument panel, front and rear end with new tail lights modeled after the Optima, as well as several other mechanical and interior changes.

For 2015, the six-speed manual transmission option, previously only available on the Base and LX models, was discontinued, leaving the six-speed automatic transmission as the only transmission option for the Sorento.

Safety
The 2011 Sorento received a "Top Safety Pick" rating from the Insurance Institute for Highway Safety (IIHS).

Awards
The 2011 Sorento was awarded the maximum five-star safety rating from the crash safety experts, European New Car Assessment Programme (Euro NCAP) and Australasian New Car Assessment Program (ANCAP). The XM Sorento awarded 'Top Safety Pick' from Insurance Institute for Highway Safety (IIHS) in the United States.

The second generation Sorento was awarded New Zealand Autocar magazine SUV of the Year, "great looker, does absolutely everything as it should. Engine is world class". The Kia Sorento EX V6 model earned an “Excellent” overall score by American magazine Consumer Reports’ July 2010 issue.

Marketing 
As part of 2014 Sorento market launch in the US, a campaign titled "It has an answer for everything" was unveiled during Super Bowl XLVII. "Space Babies" (directed by Jake Scott) commercial was premiered in the fourth quarter, featuring the existence of a faraway planet known as "Babylandia" and follows infant boys, girls, dogs, pandas and more on their journey to Earth to join their new families. After taking it all in, the curious child begins to offer an alternative theory passed on by a friend but his quick-thinking father calls upon UVO's voice-activated jukebox feature to hurriedly change the subject and survive another day in the adventures of parenthood. "Tight Space" (directed by Peter Darley Miller and Colin Jeffery) showed two of the CUV's available features – power-folding mirrors and power liftgate – help a determined father make the slimmest parking garage space manageable while his skeptical wife and children look on.

Third generation (UM; 2014) 

Kia Motors revealed the third generation Sorento in South Korea on August 28, 2014. The vehicle later made its European debut at the 2014 Paris Motor Show. The third generation Sorento shares a platform with the third-generation Kia Carnival, and is available in either 5-seater or 7-seater, depending on configuration. It is 95mm longer than the previous generation, but lower for better handling. Kia claims a rigidity strengthening of 14% on its high tensile steel and the Sorento scored good evaluation in small overlap crash test by IIHS. In the US, the Sorento continues to be produced at the West Point, Georgia assembly plant.

Available engines are a  3.3-liter Lambda II V6, the existing  2.4-liter GDi I4 that make the same output as the outgoing engine, and the new  2.0-liter turbo I4. A 2.2-liter CRDi diesel engine with variable geometry turbocharger (VGT) is also available.

The third generation Sorento comes equipped with a six-speed manual transmission or six-speed automatic transmission. Drivetrains are front-wheel drive or all-wheel drive.

Models
In the United States, the 2016 Kia Sorento is offered in five models, and four models within the United Kingdom. KX-1 base model, KX-2, KX-3 and KX-4 with the GT-Line from late 2018 onwards replacing the KX-4.

In Pakistan, Kia Pakistan unveiled its car at a Power Play event held at the Karachi factory on 14 February 2021. The event was held at Kia Motor Corporation's production plant, where various personalities from the automotive sector were invited. The car offered in Pakistan is the third generation of Sorento. The SUV is offered in three tiers with two power train options, a 2.4-liter front-wheel drive and all-wheel drive model, and a 3.5-liter front-wheel drive model.

2018/2019 facelift
The Kia Sorento received updates for 2018 or 2019 depending on market location, these included a new front grille, bumper covers and exterior lighting with similar design cues derived from the 2019 Kia Forte and the 2018 Kia Cadenza for the 2019 model year. The L, LX, EX and SX trim levels received refreshed projector beam headlamps with LED positioning lights. The SXL trim received new LED headlamps with LED daytime running lights, LED amber turn signal and positioning lights, and LED tail lamps.

Other changes include new exterior colors, new wheels, third row seating now standard on all trim levels with all engine types, driver attention warning system added to all trim levels, and a 2.4-liter engine replaced the 2.0-liter engine on lower trim levels. The 2019 Kia Sorento features a 3.3-liter V6 engine on higher trim levels. The trim levels are available with all-wheel drive, except for the base L trim, which is only available with front-wheel drive.

Safety
The 2017 Sorento received a "Top Safety Pick" rating from the Insurance Institute for Highway Safety (IIHS).

Marketing
In November 2014, Kia Motors collaborated with 20th Century Fox to create a Wolverine-themed Sorento to promote the home media release of X-Men: Days of Future Past. The custom Sorento made its debut at the 2015 Australian Open, with a series of videos featuring Rafael Nadal teaming up with the X-Men to save the tennis event from the Sentinels.

In January 2015, Kia Motors released their Sorento Super Bowl XLIX commercial featuring Pierce Brosnan.

Fourth generation (MQ4; 2020) 
The fourth generation Sorento was officially unveiled through a series of images on February 17, 2020. The unveiling of the production version had originally been planned for the later-cancelled Geneva Motor Show.

A plug-in hybrid variation and additional gasoline engine options are also being planned, along with a multi-collision brake system and a remote smartphone surround view monitor.

Markets

North America 
On September 22, 2020, the fourth-generation Kia Sorento made its debut in North America. It is offered in several different trim levels: LX, S, EX, SX, SX Prestige, and SX Prestige X-Line. LX and S models is powered by a naturally-aspirated 2.5-liter 4-cylinder Smartstream gasoline engine producing , while EX, SX, SX Prestige, and SX Prestige X-Line models uses a 2.5-liter turbocharged Smartstream 4-cylinder gasoline engine producing . All North American Sorento uses an 8-speed automatic transmission, though models equipped with the 2.5-liter turbo engine uses an 8-speed dual-clutch transmission. Sorento hybrid models will be available after the initial launch in late 2020. The V6 engine is no longer offered. In 2021, Kia announced the introduction of the Sorento PHEV which gets 261 hp from its 1.6 litre turbo four-cylinder mated to an electric motor. Claimed EV range is 51 km (32 miles) and has a combined range of 740 km (460 miles). Prices are to be announced later.

Kia continued to build the North American-market Sorento at its assembly plant in West Point, Georgia, United States. All models include front-wheel-drive, except for the SX Prestige X-Line model and the hybrid models, which include standard all-wheel-drive. All North American-market 2021 Sorento feature three rows of seating, with higher trim levels featuring second-row captain's chairs in place of the standard second-row rear split bench seat.

Awards
In January 2021, the Sorento 1.6 T-GDi Hybrid 2 was named Large SUV of the Year by What Car? magazine. What Car? awarded the Sorento five stars out of five in its review of the car.

In June 2022, the Sorento won Auto Trader UK's New Car Award for Best 7 Seater. Auto Trader awarded the Sorento four and a half stars out of five in its review of the car.

Powertrain

Sales

References

External links 

Sorento
Mid-size sport utility vehicles
Crossover sport utility vehicles
Rear-wheel-drive vehicles
All-wheel-drive vehicles
ANCAP large off-road
Euro NCAP large off-road
2010s cars
Cars introduced in 2002
Motor vehicles manufactured in the United States